Salaccinae is a subtribe of plants in the family Arecaceae found in Southeast Asia. Genera in the subtribe are:

Eleiodoxa – Malay Peninsula, Sumatra, Borneo
Salacca – Malesia, Indochina

See also 
 List of Arecaceae genera

References

External links 

 
Arecaceae subtribes